Jang Hoon (born May 4, 1975) is a South Korean film director. He directed the films Rough Cut (2008), Secret Reunion (2010), The Front Line (2011), and  A Taxi Driver  (2017).

Career 
Jang Hoon (along with Jang Cheol-soo and Juhn Jai-hong) honed his directorial skills as an assistant director under Kim Ki-duk. His debut film Rough Cut (2008), about a gangster who wants to become an actor and an actor who thinks he is as tough as a gangster, was written and produced by Kim. Rough Cut was much more commercially oriented than Kim's own movies, and the star power of its two leading actors So Ji-sub and Kang Ji-hwan propelled the indie to more than one million admissions, resulting in a profit 10 times its low budget. 

Jang's second feature, Secret Reunion (2010), benefited even more from the director's populist sensibility. A story about two intelligence agents, one from South Korea and the other from the North (played by Song Kang-ho and Kang Dong-won, respectively), who approach each other in acts of espionage only to develop an unlikely friendship, the film sold 5.5 million tickets, making it the second highest grossing Korean film of that year.

His third film, The Front Line, was a large-scale war movie that came out during the 2011 summer blockbuster season. Starring Go Soo and Shin Ha-kyun, the film was the most well-received among the ample number of Korean War-themed films and TV dramas commemorating the 60th anniversary of the war. Through the guise of a mystery narrative, the film revolved around the story of South and North Korean soldiers carrying out meaningless sacrifices trying to capture a nameless hill. It was selected as South Korea's submission to the 84th Academy Awards for Best Foreign Language Film, but did not make the final shortlist.

Jang became the subject of controversy when former mentor Kim Ki-duk's documentary-style self-portrait Arirang was released. In the Cannes award-winning film, the elder cineaste explicitly criticized him as "a betrayer" after Jang signed with the film production company Showbox/Mediaplex. Regarding the matter, Jang said, "I hope director Kim can find consolation through Arirang. He is a great teacher and I still respect him very much. I feel very sorry as a pupil of his."

In 2012 Jang, Kang Hyeong-cheol and E J-yong made short films for Samsung Galaxy Note's ambitious PPL-film project Cine Note starring Ha Jung-woo.

Filmography 
 A Taxi Driver 택시 운전사 (director, 2017)
 Cine Note 시네 노트 "Lost Number" (short film, director, 2012) 
 The Front Line 고지전 (director, 2011)
 Secret Reunion 의형제 (director, script editor, 2010)
 Rough Cut 영화는 영화다 (director, script editor, 2008)
 Time 시간 (assistant director, assistant editor, 2006)
 The Bow 활 (assistant director, 2005)
 3-Iron 빈집 (assistant director, 2004)
 Love, So Divine 신부수업 (assistant director, 2004)
 Samaritan Girl 사마리아 (assistant director, 2004)
 Hera Purple 헤라 퍼플 (assistant director, 2001)

Recurring collaborators 
Actor Ko Chang-seok has appeared in all four of Jang's feature films in supporting roles.

References

External links 
 
 
 
 장훈 at Cine21 
 장훈 at Naver 

South Korean film editors
South Korean film directors
South Korean screenwriters
Seoul National University alumni
People from Gangwon Province, South Korea
1975 births
Living people
Best Director Paeksang Arts Award (film) winners